The Varsity is a rowing regatta on the Amsterdam–Rhine Canal in Houten, Netherlands each Spring. The Varsity is the oldest and most prestigious student rowing regatta in the Netherlands.

The Varsity is one of the few student-only rowing races and a fever-pitch rivalry exists between participants. Traditional elements are combined with new technology and rowing philosophy. While rowing crews defend the honour of the club on the water, spectators on the dike are traditionally brawling with equal fanaticism. The main event is the Oude Vier (Varsity Four, literally 'Old Four') which is rowed in a 4+ over a distance of 3 km. All other events row the standard 2 km distance in common race rowing classes such as the 4+, 4-, 2- and single scull. Some races are in traditional clinker-built boats.

A great deal of the traditions in student rowing in the Netherlands evolved from the Varsity.

Victories
Two races in 1915 and 1916 are not counted towards the total score because of World War I in the Netherlands. During the COVID-19 pandemic the race couldn't be rowed.

History

Prelude
The history of the varsity starts with the foundation of the first student rowing club in the Netherlands. On 5 June 1874 the K.S.R.V. "Njord" was established  on behalf of J.W.T. Cohen Stuart and Prince Henry of the Netherlands became the patron of Njord. This inspired other students to start rowing clubs als well.  In Delft D.S.R.V. Laga was founded in 1876. The Groningen student rowing club G.S.R. Aegir was established in 1878. All student rowing clubs of this period started as subdivisions of bigger and older student corporations like Vindicat atque Polit.

In England the sport of rowing was at that time more developed and already had a tradition of rowing races between universities. The Boat Race between Oxford and University provided the inspiration for a similar Dutch race. In 1878 the Leiden Student Rowing Club  challenged the rowing club of Delft, D.S.R.V. Laga. Laga accepted the challenge and raced against Njord on 2 July 1878 on the 'Galgewater' (Gallows water) in Leiden. The race contained two turning-buoys and had a length of 3200 meters. Laga won with a margin of 12 seconds. The rematch was two years later, and, with a few exceptions, has been yearly since.

Members of G.S.R. Aegir, dispute the official history and claim that both clubs decided to race in celebration of the founding of Aegir in February 1878.

The early days

A third competitor arrived in 1882,  from Utrecht. This would become a key point in the history of the Varsity and student rowing in the Netherlands. The three clubs decided to form the Koninklijke Nederlandsche Studenten Roeibond or KNSRB (Dutch Student Rowing Association). This body would be responsible for the development of student rowing and the organisation of the Varsity.

The first official Varsity was held on 30 June 1883. In this race the turning-buoy emerged as a match-maker since Laga and Triton collided at the turn and never finished the race.

In the following years the race grew in size. More boat classes, more competitors and more spectators. The race moved to Haarlem in 1885 after residents complained about the disturbance of the Sunday rest. In Haarlem was it possible to race without buoys. Rowing crews started to train on a daily basis for the race. This was unusual at the time and thus resulted in crews dominating for years. 
The race moved again in 1902 to the Zweth, a brook between Delft and Rotterdam. Because of the small waterway only two crews could compete together. Qualifications for the final were necessary until another move in 1914 to the North Sea Canal.

40 years after the founding of G.S.R. Aegir they participated for the first time in the Varsity of 1918 and thus could join the KNSRB. The long distance from Groningen to the other clubs made participation impossible before. With a lead of six boat lengths, they won their first varsity. It would take another 38 years for their second victory.

1930–1940

In 1930 drunken spectators of the Varsity infiltrated the Royal Palace of Amsterdam which led to questions in parliament. The race was moved in 1937 to the Bosbaan in Amstelveen to remove it from the environs of the palace. This caused a great uproar within the rowing world, as the Bosbaan was only 2000 meters long instead of the traditional 3000 meters. Furthermore, the course was too narrow to fit the five boats of the competition. Honorary members of the KNSRB resigned in the dispute and the 1937 winners refused their prize in protest over the new location. At the same time it was debated to mark the coxless four as the main event instead of the coxed four. Laga openly asked that the race be moved to a new location, and Triton proposed Jutphaas as a new venue for the races. Triton swore an oath that they would organise the Varsity on behalf of the KNSRB as long as the race was rowed in Utrecht. This oath they keep to this day.

Second World War
Under German occupation, the Varsity was a forbidden event. However, Triton was allowed to organise the Varsity in 1941 as part of their lustrum. Later that year, after the German occupiers prohibited education of Jewish students, all student rowing clubs (and all other student clubs) closed their gates. 
A mock Varsity took place in a Japanese internment camp. Representatives of the student rowing clubs created a game where dice decided the outcome. With cardboard they created a 5-meter track, boats, finish tower and they even painted the boats in the correct colours. Members and supporters of the student rowing clubs created the traditional outfit and practised the anthem of the club. 
Representatives of each pre-war KNSRB club (Njord, Laga, Triton, Nereus, Aegir) played for the main event, while Argo, a student rowing club not yet member of the KNSRB, only could participate in the skiff, double four and in the eight. Triton won the race after an exciting battle against Laga.

1946–1959

Although Nereus, Aegir and Argo lost their boathouses during the war, all clubs (Argo for the first time) managed to compete in the 1946 Varsity. Triton won the race, but this Varsity is mostly remembered because the KNSRB received the honorary title 'Koninklijke' (Royal). Since then it's the KNSRB. After the war the prestige of the Varsity grew and the NOS started to broadcast the race on television.

1960–present

In the 1960s the role of the parent societies, the student corporations, started to change. This affected the rowing clubs heavily. Stand-alone rowing clubs were founded, without a student corporation as a parent. These rowing clubs could not join the KNSRB, but needed representation. Thus, on the initiative of the KNSRB, all student rowing clubs started the NSRF ( (Dutch Student Row Federation). KNSRB clubs became a member of both organisations.

In 1973 the KNSRB clubs decided that all NSRF clubs should be able to participate in the Varsity. This led to major changes in the race. For the first time since 1914, qualifications were necessary. The big culture difference between the new and the old clubs proved to be a difficult challenge for both worlds. New clubs did not like the distance and distinctive race rules. They also objected to the traditional fighting and brawling between KNSRB club members. KNSRB members showed their disappointment by wearing black belts during the first 'joined' Varsity. Since then the relationship normalised, although many KNSRB members misbehaved when a non-KNSRB club, Orca, won the varsity in 1980.

Somewhere in the 1970s club members of Laga, Aegir, Skadi and Njord began to brawl earlier in the rowing season for the supposed victory in the Varsity. During this 'kipvechten' (chicken fighting) a (frozen) chicken would hang from the ceiling in Njord's boathouse. The club who retrieved the chicken was predicted to the Varsity. Often the coxswain would be thrown into the air to catch the chicken. However, in the mid-2000s Njord decided to stop hosting this event after numerous broken bones and general damage to Njord's boathouse.

The Varsity moved north along the Amsterdam-Rhine Canal for a final time in 1971. Since then the race has stayed in Houten except for a one-year return to the Bosbaan.

During the 134st Varsity in 2017 the organisation introduced a second main event: the women's coxless four. This first race was won by Nereus.

Visual record 
The oldest sport-related film material in the Netherlands is that of the Varsity of 28 May 1905.

Notes and references
Notes 
  
References

Article in Trouw 12 April 2010
Article in NRC Handelsblad 7 April 2008
Article in De Gelderlander 12 April 2009
Article on NOS 9 April 2006

External links
Website KNSRB & Varsity
Website NSRF
Youtube account with Varsity clips

Rowing competitions in the Netherlands
Rowing in the Netherlands
College rowing competitions
Recurring sporting events established in 1878
Articles containing video clips